The Little Gray Lady is a lost 1914 silent film drama directed by Francis Powers and starring Jane Grey of the Broadway stage. It was produced by Adolph Zukor continuing his making films with Broadway actors and stars, hence the name of his company Famous Players Film Company.

Cast
Jane Grey as Anna Gray
James Cooley as Perry Carlyle
Jane Fearnley as Ruth Jordan
Hal Clarendon as Sam Meade
Julia Walcott as Mrs. Jordan
Robert Cummings as Richard Graham
Mathaleen Aarnold as Mrs. Graham
Edgar Davenport as John Moore
Sue Balfour as Mrs. Carlyle

References

External links
 The Little Gray Lady at IMDb.com

1914 films
American silent feature films
Lost American films
American films based on plays
Famous Players-Lasky films
American black-and-white films
Silent American drama films
1914 drama films
1914 lost films
Lost drama films
1910s American films